The 1985 Lafayette Leopards football team was an American football team that represented Lafayette College during the 1985 NCAA Division I-AA football season.

In their fifth year under head coach Bill Russo, the Leopards compiled a 6–5 record. John Anderson and Ryan Priest were the team captains.

This would be Lafayette's final year as an independent, before joining the Colonial League. Future league football opponents on the Leopards' 1985 schedule included Bucknell, Colgate, Lehigh and (1997-2003) Towson. The league was later renamed Patriot League, and continues to be Lafayette's home conference as of 2020.

Lafayette played its home games at Fisher Field on College Hill in Easton, Pennsylvania.

Schedule

References

Lafayette
Lafayette Leopards football seasons
Lafayette Leopards football